Kwaito is a music genre that emerged in Soweto, Johannesburg, South Africa, during the 1990s. It is a variant of house music that features the use of African sounds and samples. Kwaito songs occur at a slower tempo range than other styles of house music and Kwaito often contains catchy melodic and percussive loop samples, deep bass lines, and vocals. Despite its similarities to hip hop music, Kwaito has a distinctive manner in which the lyrics are sung, rapped and shouted.

Etymology
The word kwaito is an Isicamtho term from the Gauteng townships and encompasses styles that range from guz, d'gong, and isgubhu to swaito. The word originates from the Afrikaans kwaai, which when used as a slang term is the equivalent of the English term hot. Kwaito led a post-Apartheid township subculture into the mainstream. Despite the fact that the Afrikaans language is associated with the apartheid regime and racial oppression, Afrikaans words are often drawn into the Isicamtho vocabulary, reshaped and used in a related or new context. M'du Masilela, a pioneering Kwaito artist, said, "When house music got popular, people from the ghetto called it Kwaito after the Afrikaans slang word kwai [sic], meaning those house tracks were hot, that they were kicking." Another Isicamtho word derived from the Afrikaans word kwaai is amakwaitosi, which means gangster. The popular Kwaito artist and producer Arthur Mafokate describes the relationship between Kwaito and gangsterism as music revolving around ghetto life.

History
In the backdrop of a transforming South Africa, Kwaito took shape in the Soweto township at the same time Nelson Mandela took office as the first democratically elected president of South Africa. The removal of the political and economic sanctions greatly transformed the South African music industry.

One of the first Kwaito singles to become a hit in South Africa was the song "Kaffir" by artist Arthur Mafokate, which illustrated the freedom of expression resulting from political liberation in South Africa. House music arrived in Cape Town in the early 1990s at raves such as the World Peace Party and in the original venue Club Eden, and later Euphoria and DV8. This spread northward, where, in the mid 1990s, the genre was becoming popular in Johannesburg clubs such as 4th World, and local artists fused its sound with that of South African music. Arthur Mafokate, Oskido, Boom Shaka, and Mdu Masilela were among the first artists to produce a huge kwaito hit and popularize it in and outside of the Black townships. However, it was only after 2001 that kwaito artists and music have found their way to Europe and the United States.

Newfound freedom gave South African musicians easier access to international works and a greater ability to freely express themselves. As a result, kwaito has also been known as the expression of this new freedom, and many anti-apartheid chants have been used as lyrics for kwaito songs. Kwaito has been called the music that defines the generation who came of age after apartheid. Its pulsing dance beat evolved from styles such as mbaqanga and dancehall, as well as house and disco.

Schools in the townships were unable to fund programs such as music classes to enhance the learning experience of their students. As kwaito did not require a formal knowledge of music theory, large spaces to rehearse, and expensive instruments, it was easily accessible to individuals in these downtrodden communities.

As kwaito became increasingly mainstream in South Africa, collaborations, such as between South African R&B artists Danny K and Mandoza, have become more common. Kwaito hits often attract a bit of media attention, as Arthur's August 2005 release "Sika Lekhekhe" (a Zulu phrase literally meaning "Cut this cake" and figuratively "Have sex with me") did. The song was banned by a SABC radio station and Arthur had to reshoot its video after several complaints from viewers who were offended by its sexually suggestive content. Similarly, the kwaito band Boom Shaka was widely criticized by the political establishment for its rendition of the national anthem to a kwaito beat. As much as it was started and popularized by Johannesburg based artists. In Durban, KwaZulu Natal Sandy B came with his album AmaJovi Jovi in 1994 which had to be the big national hit and the first Kwaito album from that province.

The kwaito industry is growing fast and there is becoming increasingly competitive. Popular artists include Zola, Mandoza, Trompies, Mzekezeke, Brown Dash, Mahoota, Spikiri, Mzambiya, Chippa, Msawawa, Mshoza, Thembi Seite, Thandiswa Mazwai, Brikz, TKZee, Unathi, and the late African pop and kwaito star Brenda Fassie. The kwaito stars in South Africa are seen as celebrities who influence the culture, language, and economy of the nation in ways that were impossible during the years of governmentally imposed segregation.

TS, Ghetto Ruff, Kalawa Jazmee, and Bulldogs are the main recording companies that have discovered kwaito musicians. Jam Alley is a South African talent show that has been a venue for many young kwaito artists like Mandoza, Mzambiya, and Zola, as well as other pop stars. Some kwaito artists have even transcended a musical career. Zola, for instance, hosted a talk show called Zola 7 on SABC1.

The globalized music industry influenced the cultural evolution that was to generate kwaito. A popular import from the USA and the UK, hip hop trickled through the music scene in South Africa, particularly amongst colored people, who began to identify with an American construct of Blackness, as well as strong parallels between the hardship experienced in the many poor neighborhoods of South Africa and the ghettos of New York out of which American hip hop grew. Local flavors and additives gradually started dominating the local take on hip hop, and so kwaito started taking shape. The development of the genre and other local sounds was given an enormous boost with one of the ANC's first legislative acts to dramatically increase the number of private radio stations in South Africa and regulate local music quotas of 20–40 percent. As a result of this, exposure to local music, and in particular kwaito, expanded dramatically, which made it very popular.

Global media corporations own the distribution rights of much of the music in South Africa, yet market it specifically to the local youth.

Politics
While many assert Kwaito's apolitical character, it is worthwhile to note that a refusal to deal with the contemporary realm of politics is an extremely political statement that denounces the political status quo. In the words of Rastafarian teacher Leachim Tufani Semaj, "Whether you deal with politics or not, politics will deal with you. The statement that one does not deal in politics is in effect a political statement."  Kwaito is often thought of as a means of recreation and escapism as a genre that looks to the future instead of to the past. While apartheid is no longer in place, South Africa continues to be riddled with social problems that demand to be addressed in the realm of culture creation. HIV/AIDS and the increase in violent crimes since the end of apartheid are among the problems facing the youth of South Africa. In other words, the absence of apartheid-related subject material in kwaito songs should not be seen as an absence of a political awareness and activism but rather as a shift in socio-political focus. Kwaito artist OscarwaRona recalls, "We used to do tracks where we would ask why is the divorce rate so high? Why are little children being found in shabeens drinking?" The aftermath of a system of racial subjugation that was in place for centuries is equally demanding of attention as the atrocities that occurred during apartheid.

Many have noted that the lyrics of kwaito songs are apolitical because it mostly helps to create dance-oriented music. The listeners had pointed out that in many cases, kwaito songs use catchy phrases. Gavin Steingo gave an example in his article "South African music after Apartheid: kwaito, the 'party politic,' and the appropriation of gold as a sign of success" by saying that there was not a political view in the first song of Mandoza's album because Godoba kept repeating "Cyborg/Move Your Skeleton" throughout the whole song. On the other hand, according to Simone Swink's article "Kwaito: much more than music", it is impossible to talk about kwaito music without referencing the political history of South Africa. He notes that kwaito music started with the first democratically elected president of South Africa, Nelson Mandela. He continues saying that it was very hard for Black South African artists to get signed in the music business before. Gavin Steingo stated that most kwaito is overtly political, even if it seems like it is not. He said that it was more of anti-political situation for the artist than apolitical because the youth of South Africa desire to disengage from the long years of oppression and political protest of the apartheid era. Therefore, kwaito music represents the refusal of politics. It has also been noted that there are some kwaito songs that reflect an artist’s political view because there are some artists (e.g Zola) that rhyme, chant, or sing about explicitly political and ideological issues. However, there are cases when people say kwaito that they refer only to the apolitical variety.

Characteristics
This genre of music started emerging in the 1990s. It is a mixture of a number of different rhythms from marabi of the 1920s, kwela of the 1950s, mbaqanga/maskhandi of the hostel dwellers, bubblegum music of the 1980s, and Imibongo (African praise poetry). Great South African musicians such as Miriam Makeba and Brenda Fassie have influenced Kwaito. At times the use of styles drawn from the African diaspora's hip hop, dub, jazz and UK house is evident.

The kwaito sound originated from the use of European instruments that Black African laborers had at their disposal after gold was found in Johannesburg. Another common characteristic is the dialogue between a man and a woman with the woman largely repeating the man's lines. It is predominantly dance music with light subject matter. Kwaito is also usually not sung, but is usually rhythmic speech.

Kwaito performances require the audience to interact through verbal responses. This is done in a call-and-response manner. The artist engages the listener, who in turn listens attentively and responds when required. It is also sung in one of South Africa’s languages, which include Afrikaans, Zulu, and English. This makes it even more popular with its audience.

Instrumentally, Kwaito music is easily recognized for its use of slowed-down house-music beats, with the kick drum emphasizing each beat in the 4/4 time signature, which is commonly called four-on-the-floor. Although it draws its most noticeable characteristics from house music, Kwaito also draws upon the musical landscape that was popular in South Africa during the early 1990s, which included disco, hip-hop, and contemporary R&B, among other genres.

One characteristic that still is up for debate is whether or not to consider kwaito a mainly South African phenomenon. While many believe that it is a distinctly home-grown style of popular dance music that is rooted in Johannesburg urban culture and features rhythmically recited vocals over an instrumental backing with strong bass lines, it is still argued whether or not this is actually true because of how recently the music has hit the scene and some of the inspirations from which it is gathered. The debate is that it is largely influenced by music types from the United States of America or the United Kingdom. Therefore, some people believe, even though the roots of it are based in the movements by Mandela and the upheaval at the time, that it is not fully of South African origin. We can see the influence that American Hip Hop music has had on Kwaito most visibly in the use of gold as a symbol of power. Kwaito artists will wear gold and diamonds, completely ignoring its gruesome history and connection to South Africa, in order to portray a rags-to-riches story like many hip hop artists do. Consumption of gold and diamonds, while at the same time saying you represent your people, is very similar to the problematic rhymes of many American hip hop artists who glorify the drug trade but claim that they want to improve the living standards in their communities. Furthermore, many Kwaito artists would sell their records out of the trunk of their cars, a long-honored underground form of selling records that was common among many fledgling hip hop artists.

It is also important to incorporate the attitude that Kwaito musicians have. Many critics have a very biased and Western point of view on the genre. Kwaito rose from a ghetto culture, and most critics always look at Kwaito in a cultural-studies context rather than looking at the ethnomusicology side. What makes Kwaito stick out is the fact that the music is always associated with a cultural context that brings out some extra meanings and messages. Furthermore, Kwaito is considered by some critics as the aggressive township music. In South Africa, some Kwaito music producers say that the genre is comparable to hip hop; it is only comparable because it has become more than just a genre of music but rather a movement in which people can create their own identities with their own values.

As Thokozani Mhlambi states in his article Kwaitofabulous, "In kwaito music, the emphasis lies not in the poetic essence of the lyrics but rather in the instrumental arrangement and the 'danceability' of the composition. Therefore I disagree with writers such as Maria McCloy, the author of ‘'Kwaito: Its history and where it’s at now, who criticize kwaito, claiming that very little time and effort is put into kwaito production.... This criticism overlooks the music’s multiple social contexts such as parties, street bashes, and clubs. These are social venues where people are more in pursuit of leisure than engaging in intellectual discourse." Not only does Kwaito resist a sense of Western based oppression by remaining apolitical, but it also resists trends and Western influence in and of itself via mode of production. Kwaito, as Mhlambi affirms, has remained the music of its people, which is the music of the South African youth after the struggle who wish to pursue rest and relaxation as opposed to dwelling on the past. The term kwaito is a clear sign that oppression is not something to be, or that will be forgotten. The danceability and poetry inherent to kwaito, however, shows a reversion to better times—to cultural integrity. Through kwaito music, artists and youths collaborate to create, through music and dance, a realm where the struggle does not exist.

Impact and cultural significance
Kwaito is a form of self-expression and a way of life—it is the way many South Africans dress, speak, and dance. It is a street style as lifestyle, where the music reflects life in the townships, much the same way hip hop reflects life in the American ghetto. As a result, the growth of kwaito in post-Apartheid South Africa has changed not only the music scene but many urban cultural aspects as well. The fashion industry has boomed all over the country, with urban apparel designers such as Stoned Cherrie, Loxion Kulca, and Sun Godd'ess setting trends based on those trends emphasized by kwaito artists. YFM, a youth radio station launched in Gauteng in 1997, has become the most widely listened to urban youth radio station in the country, adhering to the principle of giving the youth the license to create its own identity. After having been rejected by major record labels of the apartheid era, many independent kwaito labels emerged such as Kalawa, Triple 9, and Mdu Music. These labels produced myriad employment opportunities for young Black producers, engineers, and attorneys in the music industry and, more importantly, has provided young Black people with a source of financial gain and dignity. Furthermore, kwaito has strengthened social integration. While promoting South Africa internationally through successful overseas tours by artists such as Bongo Maffin, Tkzee, and Boomshaka, kwaito has gained a huge following with older Black people who grew up on protest songs, as demonstrated by President Thabo Mbeki when he performed the S'guqa dance with kwaito artist Mzekezeke during his song "S’guqa ngamadolo" at the 2003 Freedom day celebrations. This marked a huge change in the way people envisioned kwaito, engendering a more widespread commercial audience.

There has been ongoing debate as to whether kwaito is a form of South African hip hop, or if the music is in its own unique category. There are many ways to evaluate this according to researcher Sharlene Swartz who says that in addition to the musical attributes of kwaito, it is important to look at production, consumption and culture. While some say that kwaito is a form of hip hop, Schwartz (and many native South Africans) argue that instead, kwaito is to black South Africans as hip hop has been to African Americans. In her article Is Kwaito South African Hip Hop? Swartz clarifies that "kwaito, like hip hop has become more than music... it provides youth with the means for creating an identity, establishing new societal norms and economic opportunities." Additionally, the kwaito artist Zola alludes to the idea that kwaito is a native South African genre in the documentary Sharp Sharp! when she explains how Kwaito is a combination of music that comes from ancient Nigerian drumming patterns and poetry that comes from the streets of the township. She ultimately parallels the kwaito movement to the hip hop movement and others by saying "I’m fighting the same struggle my brothers in the states and all over the world are fighting."

Mhlambi's Kwaitofabulous highlights that hip hop and kwaito are both genres of the African Diaspora, yet he points out their similarities do not provide a causal relationship between the two. Yes, both cultures grew out of black oppression by whites, and in a world where consumer culture has reached a global level, kwaito cannot claim to be completely free of hip hop's influence. On the other hand, kwaito is unique due to its integration of African language and instruments, and most importantly because of the distinctly South African political, social and economic conditions in which kwaito was born. A Newsweek report claims kwaito is South Africa's answer to hip hop music, and is different for it incorporates a slowed down house beat with jazz, blues, R&B and reggae. The title of a report on CNN.com, "Kwaito: South Africa's hip-hop?", calls a relationship between the two genres into question, and only likens them because both music styles have their own subcultures.

The development of kwaito has had a significant impact on South African culture and economy. It has become mainstreamed and features in everything from television and radio to fashion. Half of the South African population is under 21 years of age; therefore, youth culture is very important to the nation’s economic prosperity. Kwaito provides an opportunity for the nation’s youth to produce and sell something they enjoy all the meanwhile making a profit. This can especially be seen in the fashion industry where several Kwaito clothing lines have emerged including Stoned Cherrie and Black Coffee Label. When Kwaito first emerged in the early 1990s, "the look" was based around street threads and floppy Kangol hats. Today it is a blend of black urban style and modern influences.

Though there is a fear of gimmicky marketing and loss of authenticity in the Kwaito music industry, this will not occur so long as the industry remains controlled by the South African youth. Kwaito did come from the first black owned record companies in South Africa. The music will continue to be profitable to the country as a whole as well as the people as long as it remains a voice for the emerging middle class.

Kwaito music, in its most popular form, has made a statement by expressing the shift in interest by South African Youth taking an apolitical stance in the post-apartheid era. In a sense by rejecting and negating politics, they were making a political statement. However, the overwhelming message that is being expressed in the music and culture surrounding Kwaito is one of just wanting to have fun. This new sentiment portrays the desire of South African youth to diverge from the years of oppression and disempowerment under apartheid laws. The fading of these apartheid laws permits them to "spend a night in a club rather than under a curfew". Therefore, the lyrics of many popular kwaito songs focus on dancing and reflect the attitude of having fun for the sake of having fun, rather than engaging in the political issues of the time.

The apolitical stance of kwaito, however, has been seen by older generation South Africans as a sign of South African youth losing touch with important political struggles that have occurred in the country. As a result, these critics of kwaito claim that kwaito is losing its purpose (which is to speak out against the injustices that are occurring South Africa.) Artists of kwaito, however, claim that the time has come to use kwaito as a vehicle to celebrate the freedom South Africans have attained, leaving artists free to sing about other matters that are important to South African youth. Apolitical kwaito in this sense, relates to hip-hop as it is now: a form of entertainment. Though hip-hop from America has enjoyed international success and has been embraced by Africans, kwaito has yet to gain recognition in the U.S., arguably, because of the language. The language of kwaito (a mix of Zulu, Afrikaan, and Xhosa) gives a Kwaito a sound that sounds "messy" or unlike "mainstream party music." As a result, Kwaito remains most likely to be heard in South Africa.

Record sales
In a country where nearly half the population are under 21, youth culture exerts a major influence on social life. South Africa has a population of over 40 million; 75% are black and many are living in the ghetto. It’s these youth especially who lay claim to kwaito. Their stories sparked it, and the post-apartheid economy gave them the chance to produce and sell it. Kwaito cries out to impoverished youths in the ghetto and has given young black artists a chance to shine. Today, South Africans are buying kwaito albums in record numbers. Record numbers are insignificant compared to the United States record sales. Selling 25,000 CDs in South Africa means an album has gone "gold," as opposed to the 500,000 record sales it takes to go gold in the United States. Some of the heavy hitters of kwaito have sold over 100,000 records, making them major players in the South African music industry.

Record producers
The DJ aspect of Kwaito is extremely popular. Famous kwaito DJs—such as DJ Oskido, Spikiri, DJ Rudeboy Paul, DJ Mjava, and DJ Cleo—are well known for producing many of the big Hip-Hop South African Artists. Many of these DJ's in Kwaito release their own albums after producing other famous musicians in South Africa. The majority of them do not make much money but have very high hopes for the future. DJ Cleo said "All I need is that one chance produce just that one song for any rapper, Jay-Z, Jah Rule, 50 Cents, whatever. And I will kill it. It will become a hit worldwide. Try me. Whoever you're going to play this to, get a hold of me." Very similar to other genres of music, Kwaito wants to stay original and stick close to the roots. DJ cleo is considered one who tries to stay careful not to abandon his kwaito fan base in a flash because many Kwaito fans take abandoning the original tunes as offensive and turning your back on the Kwaito meaning.

According to Rudeboy Paul, "Kwaito is a platform that serves to drive thoughts, ideas, gives kids from the township a voice in which to speak on what their concerns are, social ills happening around them, the fact that they can’t find jobs out there, HIV and AIDS awareness as well."

King of kwaito
There are two artists who claim to be the kwaito originators:
One is M'du Masilela, who claims he was the first to mix bubble gum with House from the UK and the US back in the 1980s. The other is Arthur Mafokate, who is also credited by some as the king of Kwaito, including himself as he wrote in a two-page piece called "Am I the king of Kwaito?"

The first official kwaito song played in South Africa, done by Mafokate, with the usage of one of the most degrading words that white colonialists would call black Africans, is the Arabic word for 'non-believer' or a 'heathen' which is the word that Afrikaans described the natives with. In his song, Mafokate demands the Boss, 'Nee baas'..;

The song, written in several forms, talked about how apartheid will not just go away overnight but change is coming. His groundwork has created an avenue for South African youth to channel their anger, talent and their voice, an outlet that they can call their own. Through this music the youth were able to express their feelings of oppression. One of the originators of Kwaito, DJ and producer Oskido of B.O.P, has said that it started out as house with small additions to that genre such as congas and other instruments.

Women in kwaito
Kwaito is a largely male-dominated music genre, in regards to the artists as well as the management. But there are a number of female artists that have managed to become quite successful. Brenda Fassie, long time South African pop superstar, quickly adopted a Kwaito style as it surged to popularity in the 1990s. According to Time, she was known both for her diva attitude and scandals involving sex and drugs, but also for lyrics that dealt with complex issues of African culture and life. Lebo Mathosa rose to fame as part of the group Boom Shaka, and later became a solo artist. Despite (or perhaps because of) being sometimes called South Africa’s 'wild child' because of her sexually explicit lyrics and dance moves, she gained widespread popularity, and performed at Nelson Mandela's 85th birthday celebration. According to FHM magazine Lebo Mathosa has also performed alongside superstar performers Will Smith and Missy Elliott and has also recorded a duet with R&B star Keith Sweat. In 2004, she was killed in a car crash. Iyaya, formerly of group Abashante, is known for her powerful voice as well as "taking raw, street sexuality to the stage.". Goddess, Venus, Chocolate and Rasta Queen are the four members of the all-female kwaito group Ghetto Luv. They have also adopted an "in your face" sexual style; the cover of their first album You Ain’t Gonna Get None displays all four members completely naked.

During the emergence of the kwaito, Boom Shaka emerged as a voice for young women and a symbol of empowerment. They also use sexuality as an expression and celebration of black female bodies and the natural female sexual desires. Therefore Boom Shaka is also politically involved by trying to get women voices heard through recording a new South African anthem that simply says women have the power to change the society. "Kwaito has offered women a new kind of agency in self-representation in post-apartheid South Africa." A CNN article considered Boom Shaka and TKZee the most influential kwaito groups in South African music. Boom Shaka's music is not only popular in South Africa but all around Africa. The group's music represented the voice of young people who are often neglected by governments in post colonial Africa.

Criticism
Despite what it has brought to the country, kwaito faces critics. The kwaito music industry is viewed as male-dominated, especially in management. There are few successful female artists. Lebo Mathosa, who was one of kwaito’s most famous female artists and a member of Boom Shaka, noted that it is "difficult because every producer that you meet in our country is male there isn’t even one female producer that you could say ok I like that record that is produced by so and so." Others accuse kwaito as being talentless, commercialized and mass-produced, consisting of sexually-driven lyrics and dances.

Being male-dominated, kwaito tends to misrepresent women in their lyrics by referencing the body and sexual images. On the other hand, some kwaito groups like Trompies are using the image of the woman to make a social and political statement. In one of their music videos, there is a beauty contest and the women that win and get all the male attention are all on the heavier side. The group is trying to say that today’s perception and definition of beauty does not have to adhere to other cultures' societal standards. Furthermore, more women are entering the kwaito music scene like artist Lesego Bile. She has claimed she enjoys the challenge of entered a male dominated music genre and uses her struggles from her past to help her stay true. She refuses to never exploit her body and dance sexually to please the crowd, like other female artists. She plans on making a strong statement for female artists, while commenting on social issues.

Kwaito has also been criticized in that it has been labeled as the African version of hip hop or an imitator. In Thokozani Mhlambi's article "Kwaitofabulous," he points out various European scholars who have disclaimed the authenticity of hip hop as they believe it to undermine the cultural and historical struggles of the South African people because of Kwaito's similarity with American hip hop. Mhlambi, however, disclaims by pointing out that the Black youth of America and South Africa have faced similar oppressive histories by the white population, and thus makes sense to have its music similar as well. He also points out that the criticism from onlookers from other cultures do not realize how both kwaito and hip hop require performances and music making to be a group process and thus requires collaboration. He believes kwaito and hip hop to have many similarities due to both genre's origins, however he does not believe kwaito to be a direct descendant of hip hop. Furthermore, many scholars and researchers of the genre, including Gavin Steingo, agree with Mhlambi in that they disclaim the idea that kwaito is purely South African hip hop. Steingo writes in an article titled "South African music after Apartheid: kwaito, the 'party politic,' and the appropriation of gold as a sign of success" that the genre was influenced by both house music and American hip hop, while also drawing on inspiration from ancient African music. Therefore, kwaito cannot be simply the South African version of hip hop. Also, Steingo writes that a version of hip hop music does already exist in the country, and it is not kwaito: "Because of seemingly obvious parallels between African American youth culture and the new Black South African youth culture, people have been inclined to think of kwaito as South African hip hop, or a South African version of hip hop (In 2000, Sterns/Earthworks released a kwaito compilation CD in the UK called Kwaito—South African Hip Hop). It would seem that this perceived familiarity is based primarily on the shared characteristic of rhyming in verse. And, though this is not totally invalid, it should be stated that there is a South African version of hip hop in South Africa and it is not (and has even come into conflict with) kwaito." Additionally, it is difficult to define Kwaito as a type of South African hip hop, as there is an actual emergent hip-hop scene. As kwaito, for the most part, remains apolitical, the hip hop scene, although less popular, generates a more political and gangster-esque style. This difference is described by the South African hip hop group Godessa, "Hip-hop is universal. We were excluded from Kwaito because we cannot understand it. To us, music is not just about dancing, it is a vehicle for us to speak to the masses." Similarly, hip hop is gaining popularity in Johannesburg, kwaito's stomping ground, and its emergence is fostering a rivalry of sorts, further separating the two genres. As Kwaito is more of a mixture of hip hop, disco, and house, the hip hop scene mirrors a more American style of hip-hop.

Regardless of criticism, kwaito music now plays an important and prominent role in South African youth culture.

Cultural context and implications
Kwaito is viewed as a cultural product of the societal norms and historical context of the townships of South Africa. It is both affected by Black South African society and influences the popular culture of Johannesburg, Cape Town, and their surrounding suburbs. Kwaito serves a transmitter of popular fashion, language, and attitude. Kwaito has also been adopted by mainstream advertisers and production companies as a means of addressing the masses and selling products. A combination of the popularity of Kwaito music and the search by transnational marketers for a means of addressing Soweto youth (considered to be popular cultures' trendsetters) has led to the use of Kwaito music as a method for advertising mainstream North American products.

Kwaito acts as a reference point for understanding the social situation and cultural norms of Soweto society. Many songs such as Bantwan by Bob Mabena, "whose lyrics marry consumerism and female objectification" or Isigaga by Prophets of Da City which "expresses the same negative and misogynistic attitudes.". Kwaito also addresses the oppression of black people and the context of colonialism in which they still live. Songs such as Arthur Mafokate’s song 'Kaffir' addresses the prevalence of direct racism and Zola’s song Mblwembe (problem child) reflects the prevalence of crime in the townships serve as a means of social dialogue. A third way in which a specific aspect black South African Society is reflected by Kwaito is in the dancehall nature of its origins and rhythms. It shows the prevalence of the dancehall in the impoverished townships and flat lands and illustrates the importance of the dancehall as a cultural meeting place. South African Kwaito enthusiast Nhlanhla Sibongile Mafu best articulated the balance between social commentary and recreation when he said, "dancing itself becomes the site for a radical rejection of the traditional struggle lyrics in favour of the liberation of pleasure, while at the same time attempting to use the language of the street to grapple with and articulate the present reality for the man and woman in the streets of the ghetto".

It is said that " ...a repressive society would result in a creative art...it is an ingredient, it acts as a catalyst to a man who is committed." In 1994 apartheid ended in South Africa. Kwaito music in South Africa became a symbol of the new generation of youth; furthermore it was not just music, but it stood for a way of life and associated with it was a way of talk, dance, and dress. Kwaito reflects life for the South African youth in the townships, much in the same manner that American hip hop portrays life in the American ghetto. This type of music seems to be the newly unsilenced voice of the people speaking out freely in their society.

Critics have compared Kwaito to other international subgenres such as Jamaica’s dancehall and the UK’s grime. Dancehall was founded in the 1950s and '60s right when Jamaicans were trying to gain independence from the British. Similarly Kwaito was formed right after the apartheid was lifted in South Africa, both by young members of the lower class. Additionally both have "taken cues from the trends of new governments that supposedly gave rise to the advancement of personal wealth, and glamorized lifestyles." They also share a number of themes in common including commentary on violence and crime, AIDS awareness, and women’s safety.

The commonalities between dancehall and Kwaito are in fact rooted in a deeper relationship between South Africa and Jamaican music. African reggae artists like Côte d'Ivoire's Alpha Blondy and South Africa's own Lucky Dube were popular throughout the continent during apartheid, and Alpha helped shed a negative light on the oppressive regime when he compared apartheid to Nazism. Many currently renowned Kwaito musicians grew up listening to Jamaican music, and Stoan, a member of Bongo Maffin, explained in an interview just how necessary an outlet this kind of music was: the representations of black people imported into the country during apartheid were singularly negative ones, and Jamaican music was one of the few imported forms that celebrated blackness and gave ghettoized black youth in South Africa something to embrace and identify with. As he describes it,
"If we had to look at any other example of black people off the continent who have found their essence, it's Jamaicans. For us, for South Africans after the curtain was lifted, after we could see other things besides what was presented to us on television which was blacksploitation [sic.] movies and stuff like that, buffoons, you know the picture of us. Any other picture of a successful black man was him behaving like a caricature of himself. Jamaicans brought another element to a picture we had of us as an out of body experience. Yeah, so I think you'll find that a lot of people, you know, have been touched by the culture, in South Africa, within 10 years."

Similarities have also been raised among kwaito and grime. These genres are based out of the local popularity of dance music, in both the UK and Jamaica. Furthermore they are both offshoots of popular electronic genres: kwaito being an offshoot of house music and dub being a derivative of drum and bass as well as garage. Both of these genres are also becoming increasingly popular in the U.S.Sanneh, Kelefa. "Hip-Hop Hybrids That Scramble Traditions", The New York Times, 25 August 2005. Accessed 28 February 2008.

Dances
Kwaito is more than just a music genre. An article posted on CNN.com described kwaito as a whole subculture with a swirl of irresistible dance beats. According to Sonjah Stanley-Niaah in her article "Mapping Black Atlantic Performance Geographies: From Slave Ship to Ghetto," dancing has given kwaito increased appeal. In South Africa, beginning in the 1950s, people go to "shebeens" to listen to music, dance, socialize on the weekends. The dancing girls at these parties, often hosted in houses as opposed to licensed clubs, served as a motivation for men to attend. As kwaito emerged and became the norm of music in the shebeens, its popularity rapidly increased. Boom Shaka, the first kwaito group, was also the first to create and popularize dance moves to accompany kwaito. The steps are said to offer a window into the everyday life of South Africans by building on traditional dance styles from the region. This new dance style has also led to discussion over gender relations. Kwaito dancing has brought on a new type of female display in South Africa. The fact that women dance independently and draw men to them has been redefining the gender boundaries for propriety, work, ethics and morality for the South African population.

Mapantsula is a male-dominated dance that came about in the 1980s representing the lower class culture. This dance includes synchronized movements by large groups of male dancers. Mapantsula was also the title of a 1988 film describing the anti-apartheid struggle in South Africa. It was the first anti-apartheid film relating to black South Africans.
And Bhujwa dancing is also influenced by kwaito/house music, Bhujwa dancing originated in Soweto Jabulani; pioneered by Sphiwe ntini and Skhebstar Makhubu and then the culture eventually spread in Soweto and South Africa.

Kwaito and globalization
The homogenization of kwaito with American rap music, due to globalization, is viewed by Kwaito artists as a threat to the preservation of their local South African music credibility. Thus, Kwaito artists focus on maintaining an emotional link between customer and brand. This explains why transnational corporations are much less interested in homogenizing or Americanizing Kwaito music because true Kwaito represents and dictates South African experience. Americanizing Kwaito, as is many artists' opinion, can potentially dilute the substance Kwaito was originally based on.

See also

Tofo Tofo Dance group
Reggaeton, a similar, hip-hop-derived genre from Latin America

References

Further reading
 Gabin Steingo: Kwaito's Promise: Music and the Aesthetics of Freedom in South Africa. University of Chicago Press, 2016.
Esinako Ndabeni & Sihle Mthembu: Born to Kwaito: Reflections on the Kwaito Generation. BlackBird Books, 2018, .

External links

 
 Makokate interviewed 
 The Kwaito Generation, home page of an in-depth audio documentary (51 minutes, US, 2005).
 MWEB Music, South African Website with Kwaito CD reviews and song clips (Searchable).
 South African music (including Kwaito lyrics)
 Is Kwaito South African Hip Hop? Why the answer matters and who it matters to, Sharlene Swartz The Youth Institute 14 May 2003
 South African music after Apartheid: kwaito, the "party politic," and the appropriation of gold as a sign of success, Popular Music and Society'', July, 2005
 Kwaito Music Videos

 
African electronic dance music
House music genres
Hip hop genres
South African styles of music
South African hip hop